Bear Creek Park may refer to:

Bear Creek Cañon Park, in Colorado Springs, Colorado
Bear Creek Regional Park and Nature Center, in Colorado Springs, Colorado
Bear Creek Provincial Park, in British Columbia
Bear Creek Pioneers Park, in Texas